Wilhelm Ludwig "Guillaume" Stengel (August 7, 1846 - May 15, 1917) was a musician and a music teacher.

Biography
He was born on August 7, 1846, in Lviv. Marcella Sembrich become one of his students and they married in 1877.

He became ill from blood poisoning from a carbuncle that developed from a scratch on his lip. He had his first operation on May 6, 1917. His health improved temporarily.

He died at his apartment in the Hotel Gotham in Manhattan on May 15, 1917, from the blood poisoning after his third operation. His funeral was at the Church of St. Mary the Virgin in Manhattan and the temporary burial until the end of the war was at Woodlawn Cemetery.  He had 20 pallbearers including Paul Drennan Cravath, Harry Harkness Flagler, Zygmunt Stojowski, Ernest Schelling and Ignacy Jan Paderewski.

References

External links

1846 births 
1917 deaths
Deaths from sepsis
Musicians from Lviv
Music educators
Ukrainian music educators
19th-century musicians
19th-century male musicians
Ukrainian emigrants to the United States